Ali Mohammad Besharati (born 1945) is a senior Iranian politician who served as deputy foreign minister and also, interior minister.

Early life and education
Besharati was born in Jahrom in 1945. He studied medicine. However, he holds a bachelor's degree in education. During the reign of Shah Mohammad Reza Pahlavi, when he was a medical student, he was detained and jailed for five years.

Career
Following the 1979 revolution, Besharati was elected as a deputy to the Iranian parliament where he represented  Jahrom, Fars province, between 1980 and 1984. He was among the founders of the Islamic Revolutionary Guard Corps and headed its intelligence unit. He served as the first deputy foreign minister for ten years. He was deputy to Ali Akbar Velayati. He also served as an advisor to former President Hashemi Rafsanjani.

Besharati was the interior minister from 16 August 1993 to 2 August 1997 in the cabinet of Hashemi Rafsanjani. Besharati succeeded Abdollah Nouri as interior minister. Besharati's major task was to organize the election process. It was he who appointed Mahmoud Ahmedinejad as governor.

Then Besharati worked in the Strategic Studies Center.

References

External links

1945 births
Interior Ministers of Iran
Iranian Vice Ministers
Living people
Members of the 1st Islamic Consultative Assembly
People from Jahrom